Baktar-e Sofla (also Romanized as Baktar-e Soflá; also known as Baktar and Baktar-e Pā’īn) is a village in Khodabandehlu Rural District, in the Central District of Sahneh County, Kermanshah Province, Iran. At the 2006 census, its population was 95, in 36 families.

References 

Populated places in Sahneh County